Barred galaxias may refer to:

 Galaxias olidus, also known as the South Australian minnow, or mountain galaxias
 Galaxias fuscus, also known as the brown galaxias.